Achourya (Sanskrit: अचौर्यः, IAST:  Acauryaḥ ) or Asteya (Sanskrit: अस्तेय; IAST: asteya) is the Sanskrit term for "non-stealing". It is a virtue in Hinduism . The practice of asteya demands that one must not steal, nor have the intent to steal another's property through action, speech and thoughts.

Asteya is considered one of five major vows of Hinduism and Jainism. It is also considered one of ten forms of temperance (virtuous self-restraint) in Indian philosophy.

Etymology
The word "asteya" is a compound derived from Sanskrit language, where "a" refers to "non-" and "steya" refers to "practice of stealing" or "something that can be stolen". Thus, asteya means "non-stealing". (lit.)"not immoral"

Jainism
In Jainism, it is one of the five vows that all Śrāvakas and Śrāvikās (householders) as well as monastics must observe. The five transgressions of this vow as mentioned in the Jain text, Tattvārthsūtra are: "Prompting another to steal, receiving stolen goods, underbuying in a disordered state, using false weights and measures, and deceiving others with artificial or imitation goods".
This is explained in the Jain text, Sarvārthasiddhi as (translated by S.A. Jain):

Hinduism
Asteya is defined in Hindu scripts as "the abstinence, in one's deeds or words or thoughts, from unauthorized appropriation of things of value from another human being". It is a widely discussed virtue in ethical theories of Hinduism. For example, in the Yoga Sūtras (II.30), Asteya (non-stealing) is listed as the third Yamas or virtue of self-restraint, along with Ahimsa (nonviolence), Satya (non-falsehoods, truthfulness), Brahmacharya (sexual chastity in one's feelings and actions) and Aparigraha (non-possessiveness, non-craving).

Asteya is thus one of the five essential restraints (yamas, "the don'ts") in Hinduism, that with five essential practices (niyamas, "the dos") are suggested for right, virtuous, enlightened living.

Discussion
Asteya in practice, states Patricia Corner, implies to "not steal", "not cheat" nor unethically manipulate other's property or others for one's own gain. Asteya as virtue demands that not only one "not steal" through one's action, one should not want to encourage cheating through speech or writing, or want to cheat even in one's thinking. Smith states that the virtue of asteya arises out of the understanding that all misappropriation is an expression of craving and a feeling of lack of compassion for other beings. To steal or want to steal expresses lack of faith in oneself, one's ability to learn and create property. To steal another's property is also stealing from one's own potential ability to develop. The Sutras reason that misappropriation, conspiring to misappropriate or wanting to misappropriate, at its root reflects the sin of lobha (bad greed), moha (material delusion) or krodha (bad anger).

Gandhi held ahimsa as essential to the human right to life and liberty without fear, asteya as human right to property without fear. Asteya follows from Ahimsa, in Gandhi's views, because stealing is a form of violence and injury to another person. Asteya is not merely "theft by action", but it includes "theft by intent" and "theft by manipulation". Persistent exploitation of the weak or poor is a form of "asteya in one's thought".

Related concepts
Dāna, that is charity to a deserving person without any expectation in return, is a recommended niyama in Hinduism. The motive behind Dāna is reverse to that of "stealing from others". Dāna is a complementary practice to the yamas (restraint) of asteya.

Difference from Aparigraha
Asteya and Aparigraha are two of several important virtues in Hinduism and Jainism. They both involve interaction between a person and material world, either as property, fame or ideas; yet Asteya and Aparigraha are different concepts. Asteya is the virtue of non-stealing and not wanting to appropriate, or take by force or deceit or exploitation, by deeds or words or thoughts, what is owned by and belongs to someone else. Aparigraha, in contrast, is the virtue of non-possessiveness and non-clinging to one's own property, non-accepting any gifts or particularly improper gifts offered by others, and of non-avarice, non-craving in the motivation of one's deeds, words and thoughts.

Aparigraha means non-covetousness. Graham is where one stands. Pari is the limit. When one crosses the limit of one’s graha, even by intention it’s covetousness, not a virtue.  It’s misappropriation or manipulation. This principle applies not only to physical property, but also to intellectual property. Crossing one’s limit, craving for something or someone rightfully belonging to others even by thoughts or intentions is a sin. “...whosever looketh on a woman to lust after her hath committed adultery with her already in his heart” Mathew5:27-28

References

Sources 
 

Jain philosophical concepts
Hindu philosophical concepts
Relational ethics
Jain ethics
Hindu ethics